Crossing the Rubicon is the third studio album by the Swedish new wave band The Sounds, released on 2 June 2009. On 17 April 2009, the first single "No One Sleeps When I'm Awake" was released on iTunes worldwide. The album was available to Spotify Premium customers from 29 May, and it was officially released 2 June. The second single, "Beatbox" was released on 12 January 2010 on iTunes exclusively.
The track "Home Is Where Your Heart Is" is featured on the second part of the 5th season of the MTV reality show The Hills. "No One Sleeps When I'm Awake" is featured on episode eight, season one of The Vampire Diaries.  "No One Sleeps When I'm Awake" was given a notable cover version by Miss Li.

Background 
For their third album, the band dropped all their producers and founded their own label, Arnioki Records, and used their own money to record Crossing the Rubicon. The band supported the album with a world tour.

Reception

The album received mixed professional reviews. Allmusic delivered a very positive rating and wrote that it was "the sound of a band reaching their potential as artists" and found that only few songs like "Beatbox" would not reach up to the band's standard. Pitchfork in turn compared "Beatbox" to the music of Blondie but was reluctant to praise the entire album, writing that there had been no evolution in the music of The Sounds. These two features were also noted by the German Sonic Seducer magazine although their author marked a melancholy in tracks like "Crossing The Rubicon" and "Midnight Sun" that was allegedly new for The Sounds. A review by PopMatters concluded that The Killers had been delivering the same style of music before, so Crossing the Rubicon was nothing new. The band's image of "themselves as swaggering, pioneering visionaries" meant employing a backwards perspective instead of looking forward. The Spin magazine's reviewer praised the tracks "4 Songs & a Fight" and "No One Sleeps When I'm Awake", but found the album generally too monotonous.

Track listing 
All songs written and composed by The Sounds.

Notes
"Goodnight Freddy" begins with 2 minutes and 31 seconds of silence

All music and lyrics by Jesper Anderberg and Félix Rodríguez except:
Track 1: Lyrics by J. Anderberg, F. Rodríguez, F. Nilsson, M. Ivarsson
Track 6: Lyrics by J. Anderberg, F. Rodríguez, M. Ivarsson
Track 7: Music by J. Anderberg, F. Rodríguez, F. Nilsson; Lyrics by F. Nilsson
Track 9: Music by J. Anderberg, F. Rodríguez, F. Nilsson; Lyrics by J. Anderberg, F. Rodríguez, F. Nilsson, M. Ivarsson, J. Bengtsson
Track 11: Lyrics by J. Anderberg, F. Rodríguez, F. Nilsson
Tracks 1 & 8: Additional writing by A. Schlesinger & J. Iha

Charts

Personnel 
 Maja Ivarsson – vocals
 Félix Rodríguez – guitar, backing vocals
 Johan Bengtsson – bass guitar
 Jesper Anderberg – keyboards, piano, guitar, synthesizers, backing vocals
 Fredrik Nilsson – drums, percussion
 Tim Palmer - Mixing

References 

2009 albums
The Sounds albums
New Line Records albums